The men's long jump at the 2007 All-Africa Games was held on July 20–22.

Medalists

Results

Qualification
Qualifying perf. 7.85 (Q) or 12 best performers (q) advanced to the Final.

Final

References
Results

Long